Herpetopoma aspersum, common name the speckled top shell, is a species of sea snail, a marine gastropod mollusk in the family Chilodontidae.

Description
The size of the shell varies between 6 mm and 18 mm. The imperforate, solid shell has a globose-conic shape. It is pinkish, with sparsely scattered reddish or blackish dots. The elevated spire is conical. It isconstricted by deep, canaliculate sutures ; The five convex whorls are encircled by closely beaded equal spirals The interstices are lamellose-striate On the penultimate whorl there are (typically) 9 spirals, 17 on the body whorl, including the base. The body whorl is rounded. The aperture is also rounded. The thick outer lip is crenulate
inside. The columella is concave, terminating in a minute tooth, and bounded by a longitudinal groove.

There is considerable variation in degree of elongation, some shells being high, subscalariform. The number of lirae on the penultimate whorl, their equality in size, and the coloration, are the more salient specific characters.

Distribution
This marine species occurs off South Australia and Tasmania, and off the Solomons.

References

External links
 To Encyclopedia of Life
 To World Register of Marine Species
 
 Seashells of New South Wales: Herpetopoma aspersa
 https://molluscsoftasmania.org.au/project/herpetopoma-aspersum/

aspersum
Gastropods described in 1846